Den røde 1. maj-gruppe (name in Danish, in English: "the Red 1 May Group"), a leftist outfit that existed in the Faroe Islands around 1980. The group was a co-organizer at an anti-NATO rally in that year.

Defunct political parties in the Faroe Islands
Socialism in the Faroe Islands